Sentimental Education is the second studio album by the band Free Kitten, released in 1997 on Kill Rock Stars. The album features a collaboration with DJ Spooky and a cover of Serge Gainsbourg's "Teenie Weenie Boppie". The album is named after the novel by French novelist Gustave Flaubert.

Track listing
"Teenie Weenie Boppie" (Serge Gainsbourg) - 3:02
"Top 40" - 2:49
"Never Gonna Sleep" - 6:17
"Strawberry Milk" - 2:33
"Played Yrself" - 2:59
"DJ Spooky's Spatialized Chinatown Mix" - 6:24
"Bouwerie Boy" - 2:18
"Records Sleep" - 1:36
"Picabo Who?"  - 0:35
"Sentimental Education" - 12:21
"One Forty Five" - 2:19
"Eat Cake" - 1:05
"GAA" - 6:57
"Daddy Long Legs" - 5:38
"Noise Doll" - 1:51

Personnel
Kim Gordon - Vocals, Guitar
Julie Cafritz - Vocals, Guitar
Yoshimi P-We - Drums, Vocals, Trumpet
Mark Ibold - Bass
DJ Spooky - DJ

References

1997 albums
Free Kitten albums
Kill Rock Stars albums